Lissodendoryx collinsi is a species of demosponge first found on the coast of South Georgia island, in the south-western Southern Ocean. The discovery of Lissodendoryx collinsi and 14 other new species resulted in increasing the previously reported low sponge endemicity off South Georgia.

References

External links
WORMS

Poecilosclerida